Potential generally refers to a currently unrealized ability, in a wide variety of fields from physics to the social sciences.

Mathematics and physics 
 Scalar potential, a scalar field whose gradient is a given vector field 
 Vector potential, a vector field whose curl is a given vector field
 Potential function (disambiguation)
 Potential variable (Boolean differential calculus)
 Potential energy, the energy possessed by an object because of its position relative to other objects, stresses within itself, its electric charge, or other factors
 Magnetic vector potential
 Magnetic scalar potential (ψ)
 Electric potential, the amount of work needed to move a unit positive charge from a reference point to a specific point inside the field without producing any acceleration
 Electromagnetic four-potential, a relativistic vector function from which the electromagnetic field can be derived
 Coulomb potential
 Van der Waals force, distance-dependent interactions between atoms or molecules
 Lennard-Jones potential, a mathematical model that approximates the interaction between a pair of neutral atoms or molecules.
 Yukawa potential, a potential in particle physics which may arise from the exchange of a massive scalar field
 Gravitational potential

Biology 
 Action potential, occurs when the membrane potential of a specific axon location rapidly rises and falls: this depolarisation then causes adjacent locations to similarly depolarise
 Membrane potential, the difference in electric potential between the interior and the exterior of a biological cell. With respect to the exterior of the cell, typical values of membrane potential range from –40 mV to –80 mV
 Water potential, the potential energy of water per unit volume relative to pure water in reference conditions

Linguistics 
 Potential mood

Popular culture 
 "Potential" (Buffy the Vampire Slayer), an episode of a television series
 Potential and new Slayers, characters in Buffy the Vampire Slayer
 Potential (song), a song by Danielle Bradbery on her album, I Don't Believe We've Met

Philosophy and society 
 Potentiality and actuality, a "possibility" that a thing can be said to have
 Human Potential Movement, a social movement which asserts that all people have extraordinary untapped potential capacities

See also 
 
 Ability (disambiguation)